Streatham IHC (formerly Streatham Redskins and RedHawks) is a British ice hockey club based in Streatham, London, England. Amongst the oldest British ice hockey teams still in existence, they were founded in 1932 as Streatham, and added the name Redskins in 1974. During the 1980s, the club were one of the leading teams in the British Hockey League, their biggest rivals being the Nottingham Panthers. By the end of the 1980s, however, the club's fortunes were in decline and they were relegated from the Premier Division in 1989.

The club competes in the developmental NIHL South Division 1, where they finished runners-up to the Invicta Dynamos in the 2006/07 & 2007/2008 season. In the 9/10 season the team were 7th, placed 5th in 10/11, 9th in 11/12, 7th in 12/13, 5th in 13/14, 3rd in 14/15 and 5th in 15/16.

The club was forced to move from the ice rink on Streatham High Road when it was demolished, and after a time at a temporary rink in Brixton they returned to the new Streatham Ice and Leisure Centre on the High Road, situated very close to site of the original rink.

During the 2015/16 season the club dropped the Redskins part of the name and following consultation it was decided that the club would be known as Streatham Ice Hockey Club, keeping it simple and staying true to the roots of the club. After a vote among the supporters the club adopted a new nickname of RedHawks.

In the 2021/22 season, the club achieved success winning the NIHL South Division 1 and the following NIHL South Cup.

Club honours

International Cup
1934–35

League championships
1934–35, 1949–50, 1952–53, 1959–60, 1973–74, 1974–75, 1975–76, 1976–77, 1978–79, 1980–81, 1981–82

Autumn Cups
1951, 1953, 1954
NIHL South 1 - League Championship
 2019–20

NIHL South Cup
 2019–20, 2021–22

Club roster 2022-23
(*) Denotes a Non-British Trained player (Import)

2021/22 Outgoing

Notable players
 Ken Johannson, Canadian-born American ice hockey player, coach and general manager of the United States national men's ice hockey team

References

External links
Current Streatham Hockey website

Ice hockey teams in London
Streatham